This article lists political parties in Sierra Leone.
Sierra Leone has a multi-party system, with two or three strong political parties and a third party that is electorally successful.

Parties

Parliamentary parties

Other parties 
 Grand Alliance Party
 Peace and Liberation Party
 People's Democratic Party
 People's Movement for Democratic Change
 Revolutionary United Front
 United National People's Party
 Unity Party
 Young People's Party
 National Alliance Democratic Party
 Unity for National Development
 Sierra Leone People's Party-By Zamani

Ethnic groups and national politics 

The largest contest within Sierra Leone's political culture centres upon the competition between the ethnic Temne in Sierra Leone's north-west, and the Mende in Sierra Leone's south-east.

The vast majority of the Mende support the Sierra Leone People's Party (SLPP). The majority of the Temne support the All People's Congress (APC).

See also
 Politics of Sierra Leone
 List of political parties by country

References 

Sierra Leone
 
Political parties
Political parties
Sierra Leone